Luisa María de Guadalupe Calderón Hinojosa (born October 23, 1956 in Mexico City) is a Mexican politician affiliated with the National Action Party who served in the Senate of Mexico from 2000 until September 2006. She is currently senator-elect as a PAN proportional representative. Her term in the senate began in late 2012 and will continue through 2018. "Cocoa" (her nickname) is known as a champion for women and minority rights throughout Mexico.

Personal life
Luisa María belongs to a family of prominent Mexican politicians.
She is the sister of former President Felipe Calderón Hinojosa and Juan Luis Calderón Hinojosa.

She studied psychology at the Instituto Tecnológico de Estudios Superiores de Occidente (ITESO) in Tlaquepaque, Jalisco, and has pursued graduate studies at the Universidad Iberoamericana.

Luisa María is a single mother.

Political career
Calderón joined the National Action Party in 1976. She served as a local deputy in the Congress of Michoacán from 1983 to 1986 and served in the federal Chamber of Deputies during the LIV Legislature.  In 2000 she was elected  via  proportional representation to serve as a Senator during the LVIII Legislature and the LIX Legislature.

2011 Michoacan gubernatorial race
In 2011, Luisa Calderón ran for Governor of Michoacan in a highly contested race. Although she lost, the election was marred with accusations of corruption by the PRI and intimidation by narco-affiliated criminals.  She was the candidate of the PAN-PANAL coalition. Calderón narrowly lost against PRI candidate Fausto Vallejo Y Figueroa by less than 3 percent of the vote. She had led most opinion polls prior to the election, which was held on November 13, 2011. Vallejo received 35% of the vote, while Calderon won 33% for second place. Calderón, who led most opinion polls prior to the election, claimed that drug traffickers based in Michoacán helped tip the election in Vallejo's favor.

References

Members of the Chamber of Deputies (Mexico)
Members of the Senate of the Republic (Mexico)
National Action Party (Mexico) politicians
Politicians from Mexico City
1965 births
Living people
Women members of the Senate of the Republic (Mexico)
Members of the Congress of Michoacán
21st-century Mexican politicians
21st-century Mexican women politicians
Women members of the Chamber of Deputies (Mexico)
Western Institute of Technology and Higher Education alumni
Academic staff of Universidad Michoacana de San Nicolás de Hidalgo
20th-century Mexican politicians
20th-century Mexican women politicians